Vadim Cojocaru (May 19, 1961 – June 7, 2021) was a Moldovan politician.

Biography 
Vadim Cojocaru graduated from Moldova State University in 1982, faculty Economics of Trade and Merceology, qualification - economist. Between 1989 and 1990 he graduated from the State University of Kyiv. He got his PhD in 1992.

He was a member of the Parliament of Moldova since 2009 till 2014. He joined the Liberal Party Reform Council in 2013.

Cojocaru died on 7 June 2021, aged 60.

Courses (internships)
 1988: Institute of Commerce of Kyiv (Ukraine), Department of Trade Organization.
 November 1991: Russian Academy of Management (Moscow), "Mechanisms of functioning of the market economy".
 May - June 1992: "Market Economy Management and Marketing", ELKEPA Greece, Athens.
 April 1993: "Al.I.Cuza" University of Iași (Romania), "International Marketing".
 June - July 1995: University of  Omaha, Nebraska, United States. "Business Administration".
 March 2002, January 2005: Pierre Mendes University, "University Management and Marketing" Grenoble, France.

Professional activity
 1982-1991: assistant at the department "Economics, organization and management of commerce", State University of Moldova.
 1991-1993: lecturer at "Marketing" Chair, senior lecturer at "General Management" Chair, AESM.
 1993-1994: Associate Professor at "Economics and Management" Chair, Commercial Cooperative University of Moldova.
 Since 1994: Associate Professor, University Professor at the "General Management" Chair, AESM.

References

External links 
 Vadim COJOCARU
 Site-ul Parlamentului Republicii Moldova
 Site-ul Partidului Liberal

1961 births
2021 deaths
Moldova State University alumni
Moldovan economists
Liberal Party (Moldova) MPs
Moldovan MPs 2009–2010
Moldovan MPs 2009
Romanian Popular Party politicians
Recipients of the Order of Honour (Moldova)
People from Nisporeni District